Wharton "Wattie" Peers Davies (10 November 1873 – 5 June 1961) was a Welsh rugby union, and professional rugby league footballer who played in the 1890s, 1900s and 1910s. He played representative level rugby union (RU) for Cardiff and District XV, and at club level for (the now defunct) Cardiff Northern RFC and Cardiff RFC, as a fullback, i.e. number 15, and representative level rugby league (RL) for Yorkshire, and at club level for Batley, as a three-quarter, i.e. Davies still holds Batley's career appearance, goal, and point records, and is one of less than twenty-five Welshmen to have scored more than 1,000 points in their rugby league careers.

Wattie Davies made his début for Batley against Huddersfield at Mount Pleasant, Batley on Saturday 10 October 1896.

Davies played , i.e. number 2, and unusually missed two conversions in Batley's 10-3 victory over St. Helens in the final of the 1897 Challenge Cup at Headingley Rugby Stadium, Leeds on Saturday 24 April 1897, in front of a crowd of 13,492, played , and scored a drop goal in Batley's 7-0 victory over Bradford F.C. in the final of the 1898 Challenge Cup at Headingley Rugby Stadium, Leeds on Saturday 23 April 1898, in front of a crowd of 27,941, played , and scored a try in the 6-0 victory over Warrington in the final of the 1901 Challenge Cup at Headingley Rugby Stadium, Leeds, in front of a crowd of 29,563. Davies represented Yorkshire while at Batley, and scored five conversions against Durham at Belle Vue, Wakefield during November 1903. and played right-, i.e. number 3, in the 0-21 defeat by Huddersfield in the 1909–10 Yorkshire County Cup Final during the 1909–10 season at Headingley Rugby Stadium, Leeds on Saturday 27 November 1909, in front of a crowd of 22,000.

Davies later worked as an insurance agent. He died aged 87 in Spen Valley district, West Riding of Yorkshire.

References

External links
The Origin and Early Years of the Cardiff and District Rugby Union

1873 births
1966 deaths
Batley Bulldogs players
Cardiff RFC players
Rugby league players from Pembrokeshire
Rugby league fullbacks
Rugby league wingers
Rugby union fullbacks
Rugby union players from Milford Haven
Welsh rugby league players
Welsh rugby union players
Yorkshire rugby league team players